The Angelo State University men's basketball team represents Angelo State University in USA NCAA Division II college basketball. They play in the Lone Star Conference. The Rams play home games at Stephens Arena, a 6,500-capacity arena in San Angelo, Texas, on the campus of Angelo State University. Vinay Patel is the current coach.

Head coaches

Championships

Angelo State University basketball has experienced many highlights since its beginning in 1923 as San Angelo College, the high point being a National Championship in 1957 as a member of the NJCAA. Since the creation and joining of the NCAA, Angelo State has made many playoff appearances, and has been crowned Lone Star Conference Champions in 1984, 1988, 1989 and 2001.

Rams in the NBA draft
 Marcus Hubbard – Milwaukee Bucks 
 Greg Wolff – Houston Rockets

Rams in international basketball

Chris Jones (born 1993), basketball player for Maccabi Tel Aviv of the Israeli Basketball Premier League

References

External links